The Raju are a Telugu caste found mostly in the Indian state of Andhra Pradesh.

Varna Status
The Raju caste, which A. Satyanarayana calls the "locally dominant landed gentry", claims Kshatriya status in the varna system despite there being "no real Kshatriya varna" in the Andhra region.

Raju is a Telugu language variant of the Sanskrit title Raja, a term for a monarch or princely ruler. Cynthia Talbot describes the term as being:  

In medieval Andhra Pradesh, the title was used in both senses, and was very likely adopted by some secular Brahmins, who occupied important advisory functions. The royal usage at that time was particularly prevalent in the northern coastal areas of the region. Talbot also notes that the title, and others in use at that time, do not align with the Vedic four-fold varna system and in that sense could not refer to a caste. However, they do appear to have conformed to

Temple inscriptions from the period of the Kakatiya dynasty, a South Indian dynasty that flourished between 1175-1324 CE in the Telugu-speaking lands now in Andhra Pradesh, refer both to royal and clerical rajus as donors, together with peasant leaders called Reddies.

Modern community

Population
A report published by the Overseas Development Institute in 2002, describing the Rajus of Andhra as an ex-warrior caste, noted that along with the Kapu and Velama they were 

 the Rajus constituted less than 1 per cent of the population in Andhra Pradesh, concentrated mainly in the coastal region.

References
Notes

Citations

 
Titles in India
Indian castes
Social groups of Andhra Pradesh